Pedalboard may refer to:

 Pedal keyboard, a set of pedals analogous to a manual keyboard
 Guitar pedalboard, a container for guitar effects pedals